Khar sun may refer to:
 Khar sun Olya
 Khar sun Sofla